The 1967 Penn State Nittany Lions football team represented the Pennsylvania State University in the 1967 NCAA University Division football season. The team was coached by Joe Paterno and played its home games in Beaver Stadium in University Park, Pennsylvania.

Schedule

Roster

Post season

NFL/AFL Common Draft
Three Nittany Lions were drafted in the 1968 NFL/AFL Common Draft.

References

Penn State
Penn State Nittany Lions football seasons
Lambert-Meadowlands Trophy seasons
Penn State Nittany Lions football